The canton of Argenton-sur-Creuse is an administrative division of the Indre department, central France. Its borders were modified at the French canton reorganisation which came into effect in March 2015. Its seat is in Argenton-sur-Creuse.

It consists of the following communes:
 
Argenton-sur-Creuse
Badecon-le-Pin
Baraize
Bazaiges
Bouesse
Ceaulmont
Celon
Chasseneuil
Chavin
Cuzion
Éguzon-Chantôme
Gargilesse-Dampierre
Le Menoux
Mosnay
Le Pêchereau
Pommiers
Le Pont-Chrétien-Chabenet
Saint-Marcel
Tendu
Velles

References

Cantons of Indre